The Chichester River, a perennial stream of the Hunter River catchment, is located in the Hunter region of New South Wales, Australia.

Course
The Chichester River rises in the Chichester Range below Barrington Tops and east of Careys Peak, and flows generally southeast, joined by the Wangat River, before reaching its confluence with the Williams River at Bandon Grove, north northwest of Dungog. Chichester River descends  over its  course.

The river is impounded by Chichester Dam where some of its water is retained for water supply of Newcastle.

See also

 List of rivers of Australia
 List of rivers of New South Wales (A–K)
 Rivers of New South Wales

References

External links
 

Rivers of the Hunter Region
Dungog Shire
Hunter River (New South Wales)